Amir (also spelled Ameer or Emir) is an Arabic masculine name.

The name comes from the same root as the word emir.

In Arabic the name means prince. The word originally meant "Commander (of army)". It later became a title given to a ruler's son, and hence "prince".

The name has also been loaned into other languages.

In Urdu (Urdu: عامر) the name has the same meaning as the original in Arabic, meaning ‘prince”.

In Persian (Persian: امير) the name means ‘immortal’.

In Pashto (Pashto: امير) the name comes to mean ‘leader’ or ‘boss’.

In Hebrew, when spelt אמיר the name means crown (treetop). When spelt עמיר the name means a small sheaf or bundle (of grain, usually wheat or barley)

Usage
Amir was among the five most popular names for Black newborn boys in the American state of Virginia in 2022.

Given name
Notable persons with the name include:

Al-Amir bi-Ahkami l-Lah, tenth Fatimid Caliph and recognised as the 20th imam by the Mustaali Ismaili Shi'a sect
Amir Abdur-Rahim (born 1981), American basketball coach
Amir Khosrow Afshar (born 1919, date of death unknown), Iranian diplomat
Amir Bageria (born 2000), Canadian actor
Amir Bagheri, Iranian chess grandmaster
 Amir Bell (born 1996), American basketball player in the Israel Basketball Premier League
Amir Blumenfeld (born 1983), American-Israeli comedian/actor
Ameer Bux Bhutto, Pakistani politician
Amir Celestin, American basketball player
Amir Coffey (born 1997), American basketball player
Amir Derakh, American musician
Amir Eshel (born 1959), Commander in Chief of the Israeli Air Force
Amir Farshad Ebrahimi, former member of Ansar-e Hezbollah and currently a peace and human rights activist living in Germany
Amir Gal-Or (born 1962), Israeli businessman and the managing partner of Infinity Group
Amir Ganiel, former Israeli swimming champion and record holder in swimming
Amir Ghalenoei, Iranian football coach and former player
Amir Haddad (born 1984), Israeli French singer and songwriter
Amir Hamed, Uruguayan writer and translator of Lebanese descent
Amir Hashemi, Iranian footballer
Amir Mirza Hekmati, alleged American CIA operative
Amir Hinton (born 1997), American basketball player
Amir-Abbas Hoveyda, Iranian economist and politician
Amir Johnson, American basketball player
Amir Kabir, aka Mirza Taghi Khan Amir-Nezam, Atabak and Amir-e Nezam; chief minister to Naser al-Din Shah Qajar (Shah of Persia)
Amir Karara, Egyptian actor
Amir Karić, Bosnian-Slovenian footballer
Amir Reza Khadem, Iranian wrestler
Amir Khan, Hindustani classical vocalist
Amir Khan, British boxer
Amir Khusrow, Indian musician, scholar and poet
Amir Kror Suri, aka Jahan Pahlawan, Pashtun national history figure and a governor of Mandesh in Ghor
Amir Mohebbian, Iranian politician, journalist and political analyst
Amir Mohebi, Iranian footballer
Amir Mokri, Iranian cinematographer
Amir Muchtari (born 1972), Israeli basketball player
Amir Nachumi (born 1945), Israeli Air Force general
Amir Naderi, Iranian film director
Amir Ohana (born 1976), Israeli politician
Amir Peretz (born 1952), Moroccan-born Israeli politician
Amir Hossein Rabii (died 9 April 1979), Iranian Air Force commander
Amir Sadollah, American mixed martial artist
Amir Slama, Brazilian fashion designer
Amir Spahić, Bosnian footballer
Amir Vahedi (1961–2010), Iranian-born American professional poker player
Amir Wilson, British actor
Ameer Ali, Australian economist and community leader
Ameer Sultan, Tamil film director
Ameer Vann (born 1996), former member of boy band Brockhampton
Abdul Ameer Yousef Habeeb, Iraqi journalist

Fictional characters:
Amir, the protagonist in The Kite Runner
Amir Kaffarov, an antagonist in Battlefield 3, a 2011 video game
Amir Kazim, a character in A Wedding (Noces), a 2016 film

Middle name
Mohammad Amir Khatam (1920–1975), commander of the Iranian air force
Tengku Amir Hamzah (1911–1946), Indonesian poet
Tamino (musician) (born 1996), Belgian-Egyptian singer, songwriter and musician

Surname
Eldad Amir (born 1961), Israeli Olympic competitive sailor
Eli Amir (born 1937), Israeli writer
Menashe Amir, an Iranian-born Israeli Persian-language broadcaster
Mohammad Amir, Pakistani cricketer banned for spot-fixing
Nina Amir, Israeli Olympic sports sailor
Yigal Amir, assassin of Prime Minister of Israel Yitzhak Rabin

See also

 Amiri (surname)
Emir (disambiguation)
Emir (name)
Amira (name), female version
Aamir (disambiguation)
Mirza
Almir (given name)

References

Arabic-language surnames
Arabic masculine given names
Bosniak masculine given names
Bosnian masculine given names
Iranian masculine given names
Hebrew masculine given names
Pakistani masculine given names
Masculine given names
Modern names of Hebrew origin